Noyes Township is a township in Clinton County, Pennsylvania, United States. The population was 333 at the 2020 census, down from 357 in 2010.

History
Noyes Township was cut off and formed from Chapman Township in 1875, and was named in honor of Colonel A. C. Noyes, the most prominent citizen residing within the limits of the area. The first settlement in the territory was made around the time of the Revolution, or shortly after, on the lower, north side and near the mouth of Kettle Creek.

Geography

Demographics

As of the census of 2000, there were 419 people, 186 households, and 127 families residing in the township.  The population density was 4.7 people per square mile (1.8/km).  There were 368 housing units at an average density of 4.1/sq mi (1.6/km).  The racial makeup of the township was 99.52% White and 0.48% Native American.

There were 186 households, out of which 19.9% had children under the age of 18 living with them, 54.8% were married couples living together, 8.1% had a female householder with no husband present, and 31.2% were non-families. 29.6% of all households were made up of individuals, and 14.5% had someone living alone who was 65 years of age or older.  The average household size was 2.25 and the average family size was 2.75.

In the township the population was spread out, with 18.1% under the age of 18, 4.1% from 18 to 24, 19.6% from 25 to 44, 32.2% from 45 to 64, and 26.0% who were 65 years of age or older.  The median age was 49 years. For every 100 females, there were 98.6 males.  For every 100 females age 18 and over, there were 101.8 males.

The median income for a household in the township was $28,036, and the median income for a family was $34,318. Males had a median income of $33,438 versus $22,917 for females. The per capita income for the township was $17,094.  About 13.3% of families and 15.7% of the population were below the poverty line, including 22.4% of those under age 18 and 16.0% of those age 65 or over.

References

External links
Historical View of Noyes Township, Clinton County, Pennsylvania by "D. S. Maynard"

Populated places established in 1775
Townships in Clinton County, Pennsylvania
Townships in Pennsylvania